Friendship (formerly known as Meduncook) is a town in Knox County, Maine, United States. It is 31 miles (49.9 km) southeast of Augusta. The population was 1,142 at the 2020 census.

History
Abenaki Native Americans called it Meduncook, meaning "bay at the end of the sandbar." Part of the Waldo Patent, it was first settled in 1750. A garrison was built on Garrison Island, which connects to the mainland at low tide. By 1754, 22 families lived in Meduncook, most taking shelter within the garrison when the French and Indian War broke out.

Raid on Meduncook (1758) 
During the French and Indian War, the community was raided twice. The first attack was from the Abenaki just after sunrise on May 22, 1758. They killed and scalped Joshua and Hannah Bradford and their infant son Winslow. An original settler from Kingston, Massachusetts and great-grandson of Governor William Bradford, Joshua had remained in his house, believing it close enough to the garrison that his family could flee there when necessary. But while pounding corn, the Bradfords missed hearing the garrison's alarm gun. Five of their children managed to escape their pursuers into the fort, but two of their sons Cornelius (21) and Joshua (12) were captured and carried to Canada.

After trying to lay siege to Thomaston, Maine in September 1758, a party of Native Americans and Acadians under the command of French Officer Boishebert raided the village. Eight British were captured or killed.

On February 25, 1807, Meduncook Plantation was incorporated as Friendship. By 1859, when the population was 691, the village had two shipbuilders, two gristmills, one shingle mill and three sawmills. By 1880, when the population was 938, other manufactures included sails, carriages, boots and shoes. But boatbuilding remained the dominant industry in town, which became famous for producing the Friendship Sloop, a gaff-rigged sailboat designed for lobstering and fishing. Each summer the town hosts the Friendship Sloop Races.

Author John Cheever wrote his 1957 novel, The Wapshot Chronicle, while vacationing here.

Attractions
The Friendship Museum was established in 1964. Prior to serving as the town's museum it served as the Friendship Grammar School from 1851 to 1923. The museum is a typical one room schoolhouse, measuring 20x25ft. The museum is home to many interesting artifacts including models of ships and plans for the famous Friendship sloops.

Geography
Located on a peninsula that projects into the Gulf of Maine, Friendship lies between Muscongus Bay and the Friendship River. It includes several islands, the largest of which is Friendship Long Island (or Meduncook Island).

The town is crossed by state routes 97 and 220. It borders the towns of Waldoboro to the northwest, and Cushing to the east.

The town is the site of Franklin Island National Wildlife Refuge.

Climate
This climatic region is typified by large seasonal temperature differences, with warm to hot (and often humid) summers and cold (sometimes severely cold) winters.  According to the Köppen Climate Classification system, Friendship has a humid continental climate, abbreviated "Dfb" on climate maps.

Demographics

2010 census
As of the census of 2010, there were 1,152 people, 508 households, and 352 families residing in the town. The racial makeup of the town was 99.2% White, 0.2% Asian, 0.3% from other races, and 0.3% from two or more races. Hispanic or Latino of any race were 0.3% of the population.

There were 508 households, of which 21.3% had children under the age of 18 living with them, 56.7% were married couples living together, 7.9% had a female householder with no husband present, 4.7% had a male householder with no wife present, and 30.7% were non-families. 24.2% of all households were made up of individuals, and 11.2% had someone living alone who was 65 years of age or older. The average household size was 2.27 and the average family size was 2.66.

The median age in the town was 50.1 years. 17.2% of residents were under the age of 18; 7% were between the ages of 18 and 24; 18.7% were from 25 to 44; 31.7% were from 45 to 64; and 25.3% were 65 years of age or older. The gender makeup of the town was 50.4% male and 49.6% female.

2000 census
As of the census of 2000, there were 1,204 people, 508 households, and 354 families residing in the town. The racial makeup of the town was 99.34% White, 0.25% from other races, and 0.42% from two or more races. Hispanic or Latino of any race were 0.50% of the population.

There were 508 persons living alone who were 65 years of age or older. The average household size was 2.37 and the average family size was 2.76.

In the town, the population was spread out, with 20.9% under the age of 18, 6.9% from 18 to 24, 26.2% from 25 to 44, 26.3% from 45 to 64, and 19.7% who were 65 years of age or older. The median age was 43 years. For every 100 females, there were 97.7 males. For every 100 females age 18 and over, there were 97.5 males.

The median income for a household in the town was $39,348, and the median income for a family was $41,648. Males had a median income of $29,605 versus $19,000 for females. The per capita income for the town was $20,409. About 8.3% of families and 11.0% of the population were below the poverty line, including 16.7% of those under age 18 and 11.0% of those age 65 or over.

Schools
Friendship is part of the Maine School Administrative District 40. Friendship Village Elementary School is in Friendship.

Medomak Valley Middle School and Medomak Valley High School are in nearby Waldoboro.

Friendship Public Library is in the community.

In popular culture
 The majority of the 1995 film Casper was set in Friendship, though the production crew chose the nearby resort town of Camden for filming, citing it to be "more authentic". In the film, Friendship is home to an Art Nouveau mansion called Whipstaff Manor, which is haunted by four ghosts. Whipstaff Manor is a real mansion located on the sea front of eastern Canada. The lower exterior and interior of the mansion was built on a set.

The short story "The Run of Yourself" in Sorry for Your Trouble by Richard Ford is set in Friendship.''''

Notable people 

 Allen Alexander Bradford, U.S. congressman
 Jayne Loader, director, writer

References

External links
 Town of Friendship
 Friendship Public Library
 The Friendship Museum
 The Friendship Sloop Society
 Maine Genealogy: Friendship, Knox County, Maine

Towns in Knox County, Maine
Towns in Maine
Populated coastal places in Maine